The National Police of Paraguay (PNP) is the main law-enforcement agency in Paraguay, operating under the auspices of the Ministry of Internal Affairs. It is responsible for ensuring the internal security of the nation.

Brief History
The first Paraguayan Police force was established in 1843, then known as the Asunción Police Department under the leadership of Pedro Nolazco Fernández. In 1992, Paraguay's government ratified a new constitution, which put policing duties under the newly formed National Police (Policia Nacional), which came under the interior ministry.  In 2010, the PNP established a new aviation unit, called the Unidad de aviación (Aviation Unit), which operates helicopters to support of policing operations in the air.

Mission
The PNP is an institution with permanent high precedence in the constitution, with the mission of protecting life, preserving public order, and security and integrity of people. It is designed to guarantee individual and social development, as well as the achievement of the harmonious coexistence of the inhabitants of Paraguay, through the execution of coordinated, efficient and transparent actions.

Organization
The National Police is directed by the General Commissioner Director, assisted by the deputy General Commissioner Director for the General Directorates. It is composed of many training institutions, armed units, and general directorates, all under the auspices of the police command headquarters in the capital.

Training institutes
 Asuncion Police Academy
 General José Eduvigis Díaz Police Academy 
 Sergeant Assistant José Merlo Sarabia Police College 
 Remberto Giménez Apprentice School 
 School of Physical Education
 Institute of Criminalistics

Improvement institutes
 School of Police Strategy
 School of Chiefs and Police Advice
 School of Professional Specialization
 School of Application for NCOs

General Directorates
 General Directorate of Human Talent
 General Directorate of Prevention and Security
 General Directorate of Criminal Investigation
 General Directorate of Police Intelligence
 General Directorate of the Higher Institute of Police Education
 General Directorate of Police Justice
 General Directorate of Administration and Finance
 General Directorate of Police Health

Technical Support Directorates
 Crime investigation Department
 Economic Department
 Anti-narcotics Department
 Department of Communications
 Automotive Control Department
 IT Department
 Department of Identifications
 Judicial Department
 Department of Family
 Legal Assistance Department
 Anti-kidnapping Department
 Intelligence Department
 Anti-terrorism Department

Tactical Support Directorate
Specialized Group
 Special Police Operations Forces (FOPE Group)
 Security Group
 Traffic Group
 Ecological and Rural Group
 Airport Group
 Anti-rustling group
 Fire Brigade
 Mounted Group
 Motorized Group
 PNP Aviation Unit 
 Tourism Police Division 
 Department of Forestry and Environmental Affairs 
 Security of Educational Centers

Police stations
PNP police stations are police bodies, subordinated to the Departmental Police Headquarters, which are within the limits of an particular zone and executes the activities of the National Police in their particular cities.

Aviation Unit
The unit's current inventory includes the following:

All helicopters of the PNP Aviation Unit are based at the Helipuerto Polica Nacional in Asuncion. The Silvio Pettirossi International Airport was initially used by PNP Aviation Unit, but later moved to Helipuerto Polica Nacional, which opened in August 2010.

References

External links
 Policía Nacional – Paraguay
 Ministerio del Interior
 RANK INSIGNIA - POLICE & SECURITY

Law enforcement in Paraguay
Government of Paraguay
Government agencies established in 1843